Bartłomiej Kasprzak (born 12 January 1993) is a Polish professional footballer who plays as a midfielder for Sandecja Nowy Sącz.

References

External links 
 

Living people
1993 births
People from Nowy Targ
Sportspeople from Lesser Poland Voivodeship
Polish footballers
Poland youth international footballers
Garbarnia Kraków players
Widzew Łódź players
Sandecja Nowy Sącz players
Ekstraklasa players
I liga players
II liga players
III liga players
Association football midfielders